Dutch phonology is similar to that of other West Germanic languages, especially Afrikaans and West Frisian.

Standard Dutch has two main de facto pronunciation standards: Northern and Belgian. Northern Standard Dutch is the most prestigious accent in the Netherlands. It is associated with high status, education and wealth. Even though its speakers seem to be concentrated mostly in the densely populated Randstad area in the provinces of North Holland, South Holland and Utrecht, it is often impossible to tell where in the country its speakers were born or brought up, so it cannot be considered a regional dialect within the Netherlands. Belgian Standard Dutch is used by the vast majority of Flemish journalists, which is why it is sometimes called VRT-Nederlands ("VRT Dutch"; formerly BRT-Nederlands "BRT Dutch"), after VRT, the national public-service broadcaster for the Flemish Region.

Consonants

The following table shows the consonant phonemes of Dutch:

Obstruents

 The glottal stop  is not phonemic because it only occurs in a few specific predictable environments—namely, before vowel-initial syllables within words after e.g.
  is not a native phoneme of Dutch and occurs only in borrowed words, like goal ('goal'); however  is nevertheless analyzed as a phoneme because minimal pairs exist—e.g. goal  and kool  ('cabbage'). Additionally, in native words,  occurs as an allophone of  when it undergoes regressive voicing assimilation, like in zakdoek .
 Voiceless post-velar  or uvular  fricative.
Some southern speakers may alternate between the velar and post-palatal articulation, depending on the backness of the preceding or succeeding vowel. Velar, post-velar and uvular variants are called harde g "hard g", while the post-palatal variants are called zachte g "soft g".
 Speakers who devoice  and  may also hypercorrectively voice  and : concert "concert" may thus be  compared to the more usual .
 Some speakers pronounce  as a voiceless . Some dialects, particularly those from the southwest, exhibit h-dropping.
 In the Netherlands,  and  may have only mid-to-low pitched friction, and for many Netherlandic speakers, they are retracted. In Belgium, they are more similar to English .
 The onset sequence  is commonly realized as a tenuis alveolo-palatal affricate , or intervocalically as a stop  or fricative , barring some loanwords and names.
 Before ,  is realized as a voiceless post-palatal affricate .
  are not native phonemes of Dutch and usually occur only in borrowed words, like show and bagage "baggage". Depending on the speaker and the position in the word, they may or may not be distinct from the assimilated realisations of the clusters . If they are not distinct, they will have the same range of realisations noted above.

Sonorants

  and  assimilate their articulation to a following obstruent in many cases:
 Both become  before , and  before .
  merges into  before velars. For example, it will be uvular  for speakers who realise  as uvulars.
  is realised as  before .
 The exact pronunciation of  varies regionally:
 In the North,  is 'clear' before vowels and 'dark' before consonants and pauses. Intervocalic  tends to be clear except after the open back vowels . However, some speakers use the dark variant in all intervocalic contexts.
 Some accents, such as the Amsterdam and the Rotterdam ones, have dark  in all positions. Conversely, some accents in the eastern regions, along the German border (for example around Nijmegen), as well as some Standard Belgian speakers, have clear  in all contexts.
 The quality of dark  varies; in the North it is pharyngealized , but in a final position, many speakers produce a strongly pharyngealized vocoid with no alveolar contact instead. In Belgium, it is either velarized  or post-palatalized .
 The realization of  phoneme varies considerably from dialect to dialect and even between speakers in the same dialect area:
 The historically original pronunciation is an alveolar trill , with the alveolar tap  as a common allophone.
 The uvular trill  is a common alternative, found particularly in the central and southern dialect areas. Uvular pronunciations appear to be gaining ground in the Randstad. This is more common in the (south)eastern areas (Limburg, southeast Brabantian, Overijssel).
 The coastal dialects of South Holland produce a voiced uvular fricative .
 The velar bunched approximant  (the Gooise R, which sounds similar to the retroflex approximant) is found at the end of a syllable in the pronunciation of some speakers in the Netherlands, especially those from the Randstad, but not in Belgium. Its use has been increasing in recent years.
 The realization of  also varies by area (and less so by speaker):
 The main realisation is a labiodental approximant , found in central and northern Netherlands.
 Speakers in southern Netherlands and Belgium use a bilabial approximant . It is like  but without velarization.
 In Suriname and among immigrant populations,  is usual.
Thus melk  "milk" may be pronounced . This may extend to compounds, e.g. melkboer  "milkman". Although this pronunciation is mistakenly thought of as non-standard, it is found in all types of Dutch, including the standard varieties. There is also another type of -insertion that occurs word-medially (e.g. helpen  "to help"), which is considered non-standard.

In many areas the final 'n' of the ending -en (originally , with a variety of meanings) is pronounced only when a word is being individually stressed; this makes -en words homophonous with otherwise identical forms ending in -e alone. The -n is dropped both word-finally and, in compound words, word-internally. This pronunciation can be morphologically sensitive and serve to distinguish words, since the -n is dropped only when it is part of the distinct ending -en and not when the word consists of an indivisible stem which happens to end in -en. Thus, the teken of ik teken ('I draw') always retains its -n because it is part of an indivisible stem whereas in teken ('ticks') it is dropped because it is part of a plural ending. Such pairs (teken = 'draw'; teken = 'ticks') are therefore not homophones in dialects that drop -n, despite being written identically.

Final -n is retained in the North East (Low Saxon) and the South West (East and West Flemish), where it is the schwa that disappears instead. This creates a syllabic  or (after velars) syllabic  sounds: laten ; maken .

Final devoicing and assimilation

Dutch devoices all obstruents at the ends of words, as is partly reflected in the spelling. The voiced "z" in plural huizen  becomes huis  ('house') in singular. Also, duiven  becomes duif  ('dove').

The opposite may be true for other consonants: ik ben ('I am') .

Example words for consonants

{| class="wikitable"
|+ Consonants with example words
|-
! Phoneme
! Phonetic IPA
! Orthography
! English translation
|-
| 
| 
| pen
| 'pen'
|-
| 
| 
| biet
| 'beetroot'
|-
| 
| 
| tak
| 'branch'
|-
| 
| 
| dak
| 'roof'
|-
| 
| 
| kat
| 'cat'
|-
| 
| 
| goal
| 'goal'
|-
| 
| 
| fiets
| 'bicycle'
|-
| 
| 
| vijf
| 'five'
|-
| 
| 
| sok
| 'sock'
|-
| 
| 
| zeep
| 'soap'
|-
| 
| 
| chef
| 'chief'
|-
| 
| 
| jury
|'jury'
|-
| 
| 
| acht (north)acht (south)
| 'eight'
|-
| 
| 
| s-Hertogenboschgeeuw (north)geeuw (Belgium)
| ''s-Hertogenbosch''yawn'
|-
| 
| 
| hoed| 'hat'
|-
| 
| 
| mens| 'human'
|-
| 
| 
| nek| 'neck'
|-
| 
| 
| eng| 'scary'
|-
| 
| 
| landgoal| 'land''goal'
|-
| 
| 
| ratradPeruNederlanders (north)Geert Bourgeois (Belgium)
| 'rat''wheel''Peru''Dutchmen''Geert Bourgeois'
|-
| 
| 
| wang (north)wang (Belgium)bewering (Belgium)
| 'cheek''cheek''assertion'
|-
| 
| 
| jas| 'coat'
|}

Vowels
Dutch has an extensive vowel inventory consisting of thirteen plain vowels and at least three diphthongs. Vowels can be grouped as front unrounded, front rounded, central and back. They are also traditionally distinguished by length or tenseness. The vowels  are included in one of the diphthong charts further below because Northern Standard Dutch realizes them as diphthongs, but they behave phonologically like the other long monophthongs.

Monophthongs

 Dutch vowels can be classified as lax and tense, checked and free or short and long. Phonetically however, the close vowels  are as short as the phonological lax/short vowels unless they occur before .
 Phonologically,  can be classified as either close or close-mid. Carlos Gussenhoven classifies them as the former, whereas Geert Booij says that they are the latter and classifies  and the non-native mid vowels as open-mid.
This vowel can also be found in certain other words, such as op  ('on'), which can form a near-minimal pair with mop  ('joke'). This, however, is subject to both individual and geographical variation.
 Many speakers feel that  and  belong to the same phoneme, with  being its unstressed variant. This is reflected in spelling errors produced by Dutch children, for example  for binnen  ('inside'). Adding to this, the two vowels have different phonological distribution; for example,  can occur word-finally, while  (along with other lax vowels) cannot.
 The native tense vowels  are long  in stressed syllables and short  elsewhere. The non-native oral vowels appear only in stressed syllables and thus are always long.
 , a phonological back vowel, is central  or front  in Standard Dutch.
 The non-native  occur only in stressed syllables. In unstressed syllables, they are replaced by the closest native vowel. For instance, verbs corresponding to the nouns analyse  ('analysis'), centrifuge  ('spinner'), and zone  ('zone') are analyseren  ('to analyze'), centrifugeren  ('to spin-dry'), and zoneren  ('to divide into zones').
  is extremely rare, and the only words of any frequency in which it occurs are oeuvre , manoeuvre  and freule.
 The non-native  is listed only by some sources. It occurs in words such as cast  ('cast').

The following sections describe the phonetic quality of Dutch monophthongs in detail.

Close vowels
  is close to the canonical value of the IPA symbol . The Standard Belgian realization has also been described as close-mid . In regional Standard Dutch, the realization may be different: for example, in Antwerp it is closer, more like , whereas in places like Dordrecht, Nijmegen, West and East Flanders the vowel is typically more open than the Standard Dutch counterpart, more like . Affected speakers of Northern Standard Dutch may also use this vowel.
  are close front , close to cardinal .
 The majority of sources consider  to be close-mid central , yet Beverley Collins and Inger Mees consider it to be close-mid front . In regional Standard Dutch  may be raised to near-close , for example in Amsterdam, Rotterdam and The Hague. A more open vowel of the -type is found in southern accents (e.g. in Bruges) and in affected Northern Standard Dutch.
  have been variously described as close front , near-close front  and, in Northern Standard Dutch, near-close central .
  are close back  in Northern Standard Dutch and close near-back  in Belgian Standard Dutch and some varieties of regional Standard Dutch spoken in Antwerp and Flemish Brabant.

Word-final  are raised and end in a voiceless vowel: . The voiceless vowel in the first sequence may sound almost like a palatal fricative .

 are frequently longer in Belgian Standard Dutch and most Belgian accents than in Northern Standard Dutch, in which the length of these vowels is identical to that of lax vowels.

Regardless of the exact accent,  are mandatorily lengthened to  before  in the same word. Examples of that are words such as wierp , Duisburg  (alternatively: , with a lax vowel) and stierf . The rule is also suppressed syllable-finally in certain compounds; compare roux-room  with roerroom  and Ruhr-Ohm .

Mid vowels
  are open-mid front . According to Jo Verhoeven, the Belgian Standard Dutch variants are somewhat raised. In some regional Standard Dutch (e.g. in Dordrecht, Ghent, Bruges and more generally in Zeeland, North Brabant and Limburg), this lowering is generalized to most or even all contexts.
  is open-mid front .
  has two allophones, with the main one being mid central unrounded .
  is open-mid back rounded . Collins and Mees (2003) describe it as "very tense", with pharyngealization and strong lip-rounding.

 are typically somewhat lengthened and centralized before  in Northern Standard Dutch and Randstad, usually with a slight schwa-like offglide: .

In Northern Standard Dutch, narrow closing diphthongs  are used. Many speakers of Randstad Dutch as well as younger speakers of Northern Standard Dutch realize  as rather wide diphthongs of the  type, which may be mistaken for the phonemic diphthongs  by speakers of other accents.

The first two allophones strongly resemble the lax monophthongs . Dutch children frequently misspell the word weer ('again') as wir. An exception to the centralizing rule are syllable-final  in compounds such as zeereis  ('sea voyage'), milieuramp  ('environmental disaster') and bureauredactrice  ('desk editor (f.)').

Several non-standard dialects have retained the distinction between the so-called "sharp-long" and "soft-long" e and o, a distinction that dates to early Middle Dutch. The sharp-long varieties originate from the Old Dutch long ē and ō (Proto-Germanic ai and au), while the soft-long varieties arose from short i/e and u/o that were lengthened in open syllables in early Middle Dutch. The distinction is not considered to be a part of Standard Dutch and is not recognised in educational materials, but it is still present in many local varieties, such as Antwerpian, Limburgish, West Flemish and Zeelandic.

Open vowels
In Northern Standard Dutch and some other accents,  are realised so that the former is a back vowel , whereas the latter is central  or front .

Other accents may have different realisations:
 Many accents (Amsterdam, Utrecht, Antwerp) realize this pair with 'inverted' backness, so that  is central  (or, in the case of Utrecht, even front ), whereas  is closer to cardinal .
On the other hand, in Rotterdam and Leiden, the short  sounds even darker than the Standard Northern realization, being realized as a fully back and raised open vowel, unrounded  or rounded .

Before ,  is typically a slight centering diphthong with a centralized first element in Northern Standard Dutch and in Randstad.

Diphthongs

Dutch also has several diphthongs, but only three of them are indisputably phonemic. All of them end in a non-syllabic close vowel  (henceforth written  for simplicity), but they may begin with a variety of other vowels.

 The starting points of  tend to be closer in Belgian Standard Dutch than in Northern Standard Dutch. In addition, the Belgian Standard Dutch realization of  tends to be fully rounded, unlike the typical Northern Standard Dutch realization of the vowel. It is also used in most of Belgium, in agreement with the Belgian Standard Dutch realization.
 The backness of the starting point of the Belgian Standard Dutch realization of  has been variously described as front  and centralized front .
These realizations have existed in Hollandic dialects since the 16th century and now are becoming standard in the Netherlands. They are an example of a chain shift akin to the Great Vowel Shift.
 The rounding of the starting point of the Northern Standard Dutch realization of  has been variously described as slight  and nonexistent . The unrounded variant has also been reported to occur in many other accents, for example Leiden, Rotterdam and in some Belgian speakers.
In Belgian Standard Dutch, the ending points are shorter than in Northern Standard Dutch, but in both varieties the glide is an essential part of the articulation.

This article adopts the former analysis.

In Northern Standard Dutch, the second elements of  can be labiodental . This is especially common in intervocalic positions.

In Rotterdam,  can be phonetically , with a central starting point.

 is realized with more prominence on the first element according to Booij and with equal prominence on both elements according to Collins and Mees. Other diphthongs have more prominence on the first element.

The ending points of these diphthongs are typically somewhat more central than cardinal . They tend to be higher than the ending points of the phonemic diphthongs .

Example words for vowels and diphthongs

Stress

Most native Germanic words (the bulk of the core vocabulary) are stressed on the root syllable, which is usually the first syllable of the word. Germanic words may also be stressed on the second or later syllable if certain unstressed prefixes are added (particularly in verbs). Non-root stress is common in loanwords, which are generally borrowed with the stress placement unchanged. In polysyllabic words, secondary stress may also be present. Certain prefixes and suffixes will receive secondary stress: , . The stressed syllable of a word receive secondary stress within a compound word: , .

The vast majority of compound nouns are stressed on the first element: appeltaart , luidspreker . The word boeren generally takes secondary stress in compounds: boerenkool , boerenland . Some compounds formed from two words are stressed on the second element: stadhuis , rijksdaalder . In some cases the secondary stress in a compound shifts to preserve a trochaic pattern: eiland , but schat'eiland . Compounds formed from two compound words tend to observe these same rules. But in compounds formed from more than two words the stress is irregular.

While stress is phonemic, minimal pairs are rare, and marking the stress in written Dutch is always optional, but it is sometimes recommended to distinguish homographs that differ only in stress. While it is common practice to distinguish een (indefinite article) from één (the cardinal number one), this distinction is not so much about stress as it is about the pronunciation of the vowel ( versus ), and while the former is always unstressed, the latter may or may not be stressed. Stress also distinguishes some verbs, as stress placement on prefixes also carries a grammatical distinction, such as in vóórkomen ('to occur') and voorkómen ('to prevent'). In vóórkomen and other verbs with a stressed prefix, the prefix is separable and separates as kom voor in the first-person singular present, with the past participle vóórgekomen. On the other hand, verbs with an unstressed prefix are not separable: voorkómen becomes voorkóm in the first-person singular present, and voorkómen in the past participle, without the past participle prefix ge-.

Dutch has a strong stress accent like other Germanic languages, and it uses stress timing because of its relatively complex syllable structure. It has a preference for trochaic rhythm, with relatively stronger and weaker stress alternating between syllables in such a way that syllables with stronger stress are produced at a more or less constant pace. Generally, every alternate syllable before and after the primary stress will receive relative stress, as far secondary stress placements allow: Wá.gə.nì.ngən. Relative stress preferably does not fall on  so syllables containing  may disrupt the trochaic rhythm. To restore the pattern, vowels are often syncopated in speech: kín.də.rən > , há.ri.ngən > , vər.gə.líj.king > . In words for which the secondary stress is imposed lexically onto the syllable immediately following the stressed syllable, a short pause is often inserted after the stressed syllable to maintain the rhythm to ensure that the stressed syllable has more or less equal length to the trochaic unit following it: bóm..mèl.ding, wéér..lò.zə.

Weakly stressed long vowels may also be shortened without any significant reduction in vowel quality. For example, politie (phonemically ) may be pronounced ,  or even .

Phonotactics

The syllable structure of Dutch is (C)(C)(C)V(C)(C)(C)(C). Many words, as in English, begin with three consonants such as  straat (street). Words that end in four consonants are mostly superlative adjectives.

Onset
Notes on individual consonants:
  is the only phoneme that can occur at the beginning of a sequence of three consonants:  spreeuw,  splinter,  struik,  scriptie,  sclerose,  schram. It is the only consonant that can occur before :  smart. It cannot occur immediately before , though it does phonetically for speakers who drop  in the  sequence (very common in schrijven).
  is infrequent as the first element, mostly occurring in roots coming from Greek: chiropracticus, chronologisch, chlamydia. It is very common in the sequence .
 ,  and  only occur outside clusters.
  cannot appear in onsets except as an ambisyllabic word-internal consonant.

Voiceless obstruents can occur in stop-fricative and fricative-stop clusters.
 Stop-fricative clusters primarily occur in loan words:  tsaar, tsunami,  Tsjechisch,  pfeiffer.
  psoriasis, psalm,  xylofoon and the rare  pterodactylus are typical of words derived from Greek.
 An obstruent followed by  appears in many native words:  knecht,  snikken, more rarely  gniffelen (also in Greek words, gnostiek),  fnuiken.
  pneumatisch only appears in Greek words.

Nasals rarely begin clusters.

Coda
 Voiced consonants only appear in loan words:  jazz.
  does not occur before labials and dorsals,  does not occur before labials and  does not occur before dorsals.  cannot follow long vowels or diphthongs.
  cannot occur after diphthongs.
 ,  and  do not occur.

Historic sound changes

Dutch (with the exception of the Limburg dialects) did not participate in the second Germanic consonant shift:
  > : German machen vs. Dutch , English make
  > : German Schaf vs. Dutch , English sheep
  > : German Wasser vs. Dutch , English water

  > : German das, Dutch  vs. English that

Dutch also underwent a few changes on its own:
Compare English old, German alt, Dutch .
Compare English loft, German Luft, Dutch lucht .
 Proto-Germanic  turned into  through palatalisation, which, in turn, became the diphthong , spelled .

Sample
The sample text is a reading of the first sentence of The North Wind and the Sun.

Northern Standard Dutch
The phonetic transcription illustrates a Western Netherlandic, educated, middle-generation speech and a careful colloquial style.

Orthographic version
De noordenwind en de zon hadden een discussie over de vraag wie van hun tweeën de sterkste was, toen er juist iemand voorbijkwam die een dikke, warme jas aanhad.

Phonemic transcription

Phonetic transcription

Belgian Standard Dutch
The phonetic transcription illustrates the speech of a highly educated 45-year-old male who speaks Belgian Dutch with a very slight regional Limburg accent.

Orthographic version
De noordenwind en de zon waren ruzie aan het maken over wie het sterkste was toen er een reiziger voorbij kwam met een warme jas aan.

Phonemic transcription

Phonetic transcription

See also
 Dutch orthography
 Hard and soft G in Dutch
 Afrikaans phonology

References

Bibliography

 
 
 
 
 
 
 
 
 
 
 
  A summary of the presentation can be found here.

Further reading

External links

 
Phonology
Netherlandic studies